Sršeň is a Czech-language surname. It means "hornet" in English.

Some notable people with the surname include:
 Lubomír Sršeň (born 1954), Czech weightlifter
 Tomáš Sršeň (born 1966), Czech ice hockey player
 Václav Sršeň (1925–1996), Czechoslovak footballer

Czech-language surnames